The men's 800 metres at the 1962 European Athletics Championships was held in Belgrade, then Yugoslavia, at JNA Stadium on 13, 14, and 15 September 1962.

Medalists

Results

Final
15 September

Semi-finals
14 September

Semi-final 1

Semi-final 2

Heats
13 September

Heat 1

Heat 2

Heat 3

Heat 4

Heat 5

Heat 6

Participation
According to an unofficial count, 24 athletes from 15 countries participated in the event.

 (1)
 (1)
 (3)
 (2)
 (1)
 (3)
 (2)
 (1)
 (1)
 (1)
 (2)
 (1)
 (1)
 (3)
 (1)

References

800 metres
800 metres at the European Athletics Championships